Autographa aemula is a moth of the family Noctuidae. It is found in mountainous areas, more specifically in the Alps, Southern France, Northeast Turkey and the Caucasus.

The wingspan is 36–42 mm. The moth flies from June to August depending on the location.

The larvae feed on Leontodon, Hieracium, Plantago and Trifolium species.

External links

Fauna Europaea
Autographa up funet (Taxonomy)
www.lepiforum.de
www.schmetterlinge-deutschlands.de

Plusiini
Moths of Europe
Moths of Asia
Moths described in 1775
Taxa named by Michael Denis
Taxa named by Ignaz Schiffermüller